Facobly Department is a department of Guémon Region in Montagnes District, Ivory Coast. In 2021, its population was 94,610 and its seat is the settlement of Facobly. The sub-prefectures of the department are Facobly, Guézon, Koua, Sémien, and Tiény-Séably.

History
Facobly Department was created in 2012 by dividing Kouibly Department.

Notes

Departments of Guémon
States and territories established in 2012
2012 establishments in Ivory Coast